Bojhena Shey Bojhena (English: He/She doesn't understand) is a 2012 Indian Bengali romantic drama film by Raj Chakraborty and produced by Shree Venkatesh Films. The film illustrates two love stories – with Soham Chakraborty & Mimi Chakraborty playing the characters in one of the stories and Abir Chatterjee & Payel Sarkar playing the other – which join in the climax. The film was initially titled Prem Amar 2 but eventually the director changed the name because of the entry of two new characters and a different storyline. The film's music is by debutante Arindam Chatterjee.
The film's theatrical trailer was unveiled on the film's official YouTube channel on 8 December 2012. This film is a remake of Tamil film named Engaeyum Eppothum (Anywhere Anytime) released in 2011.

Plot

The film starts with an accident. Then it flashes back several months before when Joyeeta, (Payel Sarkar) an educated and beautiful  young girl from the City of Balurghat comes to Kolkata to give an interview for her work. But her sister who was supposed to guide her around the city could not come due to the stroke of her father-in-law. She takes help from a stranger boy named Abhik (Abir Chatterjee) who bunks his job in order to help her but ends up the entire day with her. The next day Joyeeta returns to her village and soon realizes her love for Abhik. Meanwhile, in the city Abhik also realizes the same and started planning to go to Balurghat to meet her.

Then a parallel story takes place where Noor Islam (Soham Chakraborty), a poor guy from the village of Murshidabad comes to Malda to find a suitable work. Noor falls for the heavenly beauty and charm of a gorgeous young girl Rhea (Mimi Chakraborty), who is an educated nurse by profession. Rhea happens to be Noor's neighbour and he watches her every morning for the last six months. One day Rhea meets Noor. Noor expresses his love for her. Rhea, however, is bold and independent, agrees to his love and commences to command him mercilessly. She puts him through several tests such as getting him to agree to organ donation, HIV testing, talking him to a police sub-inspector who is her father, fixing meeting with her former one-sided lover and so on. She wants him to decide on the basis of all that she's put him through as to whether he wants to marry her and spend the rest of his life with her. Noor responds affirmatively and the two grow to love each other unconditionally with the consent of their families.

Then the story flashes back to the present where Noor takes Rhea to meet his parents. They ride the same bus which is boarded by Abhik too who went to meet Joyeeta albeit he is returning as he could not find her address. Then another bus shows Joyeeta who is returning to Balurghat from Kolkata, where she went again to meet Abhik. Besides, it also shows a glimpse of a mother and her child, a girls' hockey team, a newly married couple, two college students who are attracted to each other and a man returning from Dubai to see his five-year-old daughter for the first time. As they are about to reach their destination, the buses collide head-on, creating a devastating accident. People rush to their aid. Noor ends up with a severe head injury and Rhea forces him to go to the hospital by an ambulance which was leaving. She stays back to help others as being a nurse, it was her job. Abhik also starts helping others. Finally he sees Joyeeta injured in another bus. At the hospital, Abhik confesses his love to Joyeeta at her bedside, and she manages to regain consciousness. The film ends with a tragic part as showing Noor and Joyeeta dead. The concluding scene shows Noor's body being taken away by a hysteric Rhea and his grieving parents while Abhik affectionately caresses the palm of a lifeless Joyeeta inside the ICU only to leave the hospital later, in grief. The site of the crash is declared an accident prone-area, and the film ends with few messages on road safety. One can never understand the reason behind what life has in store for him/her. Hence, the name:  'Bojhena Shey Bojhena'.

Cast 
 Soham Chakraborty as Noor Islam
 Mimi Chakraborty as Riya Dutta
 Abir Chatterjee as Abheek
 Payel Sarkar as Jayeeta
 Ena Saha as Priyanka
 Debomoy Mukherjee as Gourab
 Raj Chakraborty as cameo appearance
 Sancharee Mukherjee as taxi passenger
 Ashim Roy Chowdhury as Noor's boss
Rumki Chatterjee as Noor's Mother
Pradip Dhar as Man who posed as Goddess Kali
Judhajit Banerjee as Co- Passenger
Saibal Banerjee as Doctor
Nayana Bandopadhyay as Jayeeta's friend 
Dhiman Bhattacharya as Noor's colleague
Koushik Roy as Bus Co-Passenger
Madhumita Chakraborty as Riya's mother

Soundtrack 
The film's original soundtrack is composed by debutante Arindom Chatterjee whilst the background score and the title track is by Indraadip Dasgupta, and the lyrics have been penned by Prasen. The first single, named "Na Re Na" was released on YouTube on 1 December 2012, with an overwhelming response – . The audio is released on V Music.Two songs ( "Na Re Na" and "Bhogobaan" ) were adapted from the original Tamil soundtrack of Engaeyum Eppothum.

Track listing

References

External links
 
 Bojhena Shey Bojhena in Gomolo

2012 films
Indian interfaith romance films
Bengali remakes of Tamil films
Films scored by Arindam Chatterjee
Films scored by Indradeep Dasgupta
Bengali-language Indian films
2010s Bengali-language films
Films directed by Raj Chakraborty
Indian drama road movies